Campos is a municipality on the island of Mallorca, Spain, located on the south side of the island in the comarca of Migjorn. It borders the municipalities Llucmajor, Porreres, Felanitx, Santanyí, and ses Salines.

The urban centers are the village of Campos and two tourist towns, sa Ràpita and ses Covetes. There are seven population centers in all.

Economy
The economy of this municipality has been linked to agriculture since its foundation. Its lands are fertile and it uses irrigation cultivation.

Today the two coastal towns have developed because of tourism.

Features 
 Aljub de la Font Santa, an historic building, housing a rainwater storage well, built in 1671–1673.

References

External links
Official page 
Pueblos de Mallorca 
English tourist guide to Campos, Mallorca

Municipalities in Mallorca
Populated places in Mallorca